The Men's Downhill competition of the Vancouver 2010 Paralympics was held at Whistler Blackcomb in Whistler, British Columbia. The competition was scheduled for Saturday, March 13, but was postponed to Thursday, March 18 due to bad weather conditions.

Visually Impaired
In the downhill visually impaired, the athlete with a visual impairment has a sighted guide. The two skiers are considered a team, and dual medals are awarded.

Sitting

Standing

See also
Alpine skiing at the 2010 Winter Olympics – Men's downhill

References

External links
2010 Winter Plympics schedule and results, at the official website of the 2010 Winter Paralympics in Vancouver

Men's downhill
Winter Paralympics